Gao Lin (born 14 February 1986) is a Chinese professional footballer who plays as a forward for Chinese Super League club Shenzhen.

He is the all-time top goalscorer for Guangzhou Evergrande – his previous club – with 113 goals, and has also made the most appearances for the club. Gao is considered one of China's most technical strikers and is known by the nickname Gao Linsmann.

Club career

Shanghai Shenhua
Gao Lin started his football career with Shanghai Shenhua in 2005 where he made his league debut on 21 August 2005 in a 1–0 win against Liaoning Zhongyu, coming on as a substitute for Xie Hui. While his height and heading ability were quickly utilized, Gao was unable to establish himself as an immediate first team regular within the team throughout the subsequent seasons and often found himself playing on the flanks. It was only once Xie left Shanghai at the end of the 2007 league season before Gao started to really establish himself as a regular first team member, playing as striker once more. In the 2008 season, he would score eight goals in 21 league appearances to help guide Shanghai to a runners-up position.

Despite having his most productive season with Shanghai and establishing himself within the Chinese national team. Gao's contract was up for renewal and his club would transfer list him in early 2009. This saw him linked with his hometown club of Henan Construction as well as K-League club Jeonbuk Hyundai Motors; however, nothing materialized from these rumours after Gao decided to eventually stay at the club when it was announced that Shanghai and Gao had come to terms about a contract renewal which would expire in 2012.

Guangzhou Evergrande
 
On 10 March 2010, Gao transferred to Guangzhou Evergrande, who were newly relegated to China League One in the fallout of a match-fixing scandal. However, the club's new owners, Evergrande Real Estate Group, were able to tempt Gao with a lucrative 3,000,000 yuan a year deal to play within the second tier. He made his debut for the club on 3 April 2010 in a 3–1 against Beijing BIT, also scoring his first two goals for the club. On 30 October 2010, Guangzhou successfully finished as second tier champions for the second time with a 3–1 win against Hunan Billows. Gao's first half hat-trick in this match ensured that he finished the season as the second tier top goalscorer, having scored 20 goals.

Although Guangzhou signed several players to strengthened the team's attacking power including Darío Conca and Cléo in the 2011 season, Gao was still a regular in the team, playing mostly as a left winger and scoring 11 goals in 29 appearances. Guangzhou eventually won the top tier league title for the first time in the club's history as Gao won his first top tier league title with the club.

Gao scored his first goal of the season on 15 May 2012 in a 2–1 win against Buriram United in the 2012 AFC Champions League, ending a goal drought that stretched 1403 minutes. On 20 May 2012, he scored his first league goal of the season in a 1–0 win against Qingdao Jonoon which ended a run of 936 minutes without a goal in the league. On 27 October 2012, Gao scored the decisive goal, assisted by Conca, in injury time in a 1–0 win against Liaoning Whowin to give Guangzhou their second top tier league title and they became the first team ever in the league's history to defend the title.

In the first leg of the 2012 Chinese FA Cup final, Gao received two yellow cards in less than three minutes at the start of the 80th minute. The first yellow card was for dissent on a questionable tackle. The second one came after protesting and dissent which earned him a red card and suspended him from playing in the second leg. On 12 November 2012, Gao was fined by the CFA for $200,000 for his actions in the first leg of the final. Later, Gao took to Weibo to publicly apologize to his millions of followers and said he "deserved to be punished" because it will help him "to not do it again in the future". Later in November 2012, he was selected as one of the two forwards in the 2012 Chinese Super League Team of the Year alongside Cristian Dănălache of Jiangsu Sainty.

During the 2013 season, his role shifted from an attacking role to an assister as he provided many assists to the foreign contingent of Elkeson, Dario Conca and Muriqui. Throughout both the 2013 season and 2013 AFC Champions League, his style of play included more flair as he attempted bicycle kicks and back-heel passes which many plaudits lauded. Gao was a cog in the engine of Guangzhou as he helped it through its golden year to win its third successive top tier league title. In the league-winning game, he scored the third goal for the club on 6 October 2013 in a 4–2 win against Shandong Luneng. This was the second time in which Gao has scored in a league-winning game.

Shenzhen F.C.
Gao Lin joined Shenzhen F.C. for a free transfer agent on Feb 24 2020. He would go on to make his debut and score his first goal for the club against Guangzhou R&F F.C. in a league game on 26 July 2020 in a 3–0 victory.

International career
 
Gao was part of the squad in the 2008 Summer Olympics where he played in all three group games and started in the first two games as the Chinese under-23 national team were knocked out in the group stage.

Gao made his debut for the Chinese national team against South Korea on 31 July 2005 in the 2005 East Asian Football Championship where he was sent off mistakenly by referee Yuichi Nishimura; The East Asian Football Federation cancelled Gao's red card and apologized to him the next day. After that inauspicious start to his international career, Gao started to impose himself within the team, and despite making his debut in 2005 for the national team, Gao had to wait until 21 January 2009 to score his first goal in a 6–1 win against Vietnam during 2011 AFC Asian Cup qualification, scoring a hat-trick.

Gao scored in a 3–0 win against South Korea during the 2010 East Asian Football Championship, helping China beat South Korea for the first time ever. Gao captained the national team for the first time on 22 February 2012 in a 2–0 win against Kuwait. On 10 September 2018, Gao won his 100th cap for China in a 0–0 draw against Bahrain, making him the fifth Chinese man to win 100 caps.

Personal life
Gao married Wang Chen, who is a reporter and host for Shenzhen Media Group, on 3 September 2013. Gao's childhood idol is the revered German striker Jürgen Klinsmann. He prefers to wear the kit number 18 while playing for the Chinese national team in honour of Klinsmann, while at the 2008 Beijing Olympics, he wore the kit number 9, which was also worn by Klinsmann in Seoul.

Career statistics

Club statistics
.

International statistics

International goals
 
Scores and results list China's goal tally first.

Honours

Club
Shanghai Shenhua
A3 Champions Cup: 2007

Guangzhou Evergrande
Chinese Super League: 2011, 2012, 2013, 2014, 2015, 2016, 2017, 2019
AFC Champions League: 2013, 2015
China League One: 2010
Chinese FA Cup: 2012, 2016
Chinese FA Super Cup: 2012, 2016, 2017, 2018

International
China PR national football team
East Asian Football Championship: 2005, 2010

Individual
China League One Top Goalscorer: 2010
Chinese Super League Team of the Year: 2012, 2016, 2017

See also
 List of men's footballers with 100 or more international caps

References

External links 
 Player profile and news at Sina.com
 
 Player stats at Sohu.com

1986 births
Living people
Chinese footballers
Footballers from Henan
Olympic footballers of China
People from Zhengzhou
Shanghai Shenhua F.C. players
China international footballers
Guangzhou F.C. players
Shenzhen F.C. players
Association football forwards
Chinese Super League players
China League One players
Footballers at the 2006 Asian Games
Footballers at the 2008 Summer Olympics
2011 AFC Asian Cup players
2015 AFC Asian Cup players
2019 AFC Asian Cup players
FIFA Century Club
Asian Games competitors for China